The 1978–79 Cheshire County Football League was the 55th in the history of the Cheshire County League, a football competition in England. Teams were divided into two divisions.

Division One

The division featured 1 new team:
 Fleetwood Town

League table

Division Two

The division featured 18 new teams:
 Accrington Stanley, from Lancashire Combination
 Anson Villa, from Manchester League Premier Division
 Ashton Town, from Lancashire Combination
 Atherton Collieries, from Lancashire Combination
 Bootle, from Lancashire Combination
 Congleton Town, from Mid-Cheshire League Division One
 Curzon Ashton, from Manchester League Premier Division
 Eastwood Hanley, from West Midlands (Regional) League Premier Division
 Ford Motors, from Lancashire Combination
 Glossop, from Manchester League Premier Division
 Irlam Town, from Manchester League Premier Division
 Kirkby Town, from Lancashire Combination
 Maghull, from Lancashire Combination
 Prescot BI, from Liverpool County Combination
 Prescot Town, from Mid-Cheshire League Division One
 Prestwich Heys, relegated from last seasons Cheshire County League
 Skelmersdale United, from Lancashire Combination
 Warrington Town, from Mid-Cheshire League Division One

League table

References

Cheshire County League